Bill McKeown (born c. 1941) is a former American football coach. He served as the head football coach at Curry College in Milton, Massachusetts from 1969 to 1971 and Jersey City State College—now known as New Jersey City University (NJCU)—Jersey City, New Jersey from 1974 to 1975, compiling a career college football coaching record of 15–26–1. A native of Brookline, Massachusetts, McKeown attended Northeastern University in Boston, where played football as an end and baseball as a center fielder.

McKeown was hired in 1990 as the head football coach at Dean Junior College—now known as Dean College–in Franklin, Massachusetts.

Head coaching record

College football

References

Year of birth missing (living people)
1940s births
Living people
American football ends
Center fielders
Boston University Terriers football coaches
Curry Colonels football coaches
Dean Bulldogs football coaches
New Jersey City Gothic Knights football coaches
Northeastern Huskies baseball players
Northeastern Huskies football coaches
Northeastern Huskies football players
Western Illinois Leathernecks football coaches
Kent State Golden Flashes football players
High school football coaches in Massachusetts
High school football coaches in New Jersey
High school wrestling coaches in the United States
Junior college football coaches in the United States
Sportspeople from Brookline, Massachusetts
Coaches of American football from Massachusetts
Players of American football from Massachusetts
Baseball players from Massachusetts